The Mary Star of the Sea Church is a religious building of the Catholic Church located in the town of Simpson Bay in St. Maarten in the Dutch part of the Caribbean island of St. Martin in the Lesser Antilles, a constituent country of the Kingdom of the Netherlands.

It is a temple that follows the Roman or Latin rite and depends on the Catholic Diocese of Willemstad based on the island of Curacao. All Masses are offered in English.

Its history dates back to 1897 when it began as a small chapel, which was later replaced by the need for a larger building and this church was dedicated to St. Mary Star of the Sea in 1965.

See also
Roman Catholicism in Sint Maarten
Mary Star of the Sea

References

Roman Catholic churches in Sint Maarten
Roman Catholic churches completed in 1965
20th-century Roman Catholic church buildings in the Netherlands